Tuscarora High School is a public high school located in Leesburg, a town in Loudoun County, Virginia, United States, and is part of Loudoun County Public Schools.  The school opened in the 2010–2011 school year and consists of students from Leesburg and Lucketts.

History

Tuscarora opened in the fall of 2010. The school was originally planned to open for the 2008–2009 school year, but site acquisition delays caused the school to open two years later than planned. Until the 2012, with the opening of John Champe High School, Tuscarora was the largest high school in Loudoun County with a capacity of 1,800 students. Pamela Croft is the first and current principal at Tuscarora.

Academics
Tuscarora High School is fully accredited. The school received the "accredited with warning" rating in the 2014–2015 school year for achieving below the standard on math benchmarks. This is the second time the school missed full accreditation for failing to meet the 75% pass rate required on state standardized tests. The school received full accreditation in 2016.

Tuscarora offers Dual Enrollment courses through Northern Virginia Community College.

Demographics 
The student body makeup is 52 percent male and 48 percent female, and the total minority enrollment is 41 percent.

Band
The marching band represented Virginia in the 2015 Pearl Harbor Day Parade in Honolulu, Hawaii. The Tuscarora Marching Band commonly known as the Tuscarora Marching Huskies are 3 time state champions. Their most recent state championship award was received in 2022. Benjamin Williams was the first band director of Tuscarora. The current band director is Mckenzie Durgin. The band is scheduled to play in the 2023 Pearl Harbor Day Parade in Honolulu, Hawaii.

Sports
In Fall 2014, the Tuscarora Girls Cross Country team won the first ever state championship for the school. In November 2017, the girls won their 3rd Class 5A State Title in 4 years. Tuscarora's Football team is first in Division 5A in the state of Virginia.

Enrollment history

References

External links
Official Website
Loudoun County Public Schools website

Public high schools in Virginia
Schools in Loudoun County, Virginia
Educational institutions established in 2010
2010 establishments in Virginia
Leesburg, Virginia